Pia Arena MM (Japanese: ぴあアリーナMM) is a dedicated music arena. in Minatomirai, Nishi-ku, Yokohama, Kanagawa Prefecture, Japan operated by Pia Corporation. Before the official name was decided, it was tentatively called "Pia MM Arena".

History 
In July 2017, PIA, a ticket sales company, announced plans for a large-scale music arena with four floors and a seating capacity of 10,000 (when seated) in the 38th district of the Minato Mirai district (along Minato Mirai Boulevard). Construction by Sato Kogyo began in December of the same year and was completed in March 2020.

The opening performance was originally scheduled for April 25 by Yuzu from Yokohama as part of their national arena tour, but was postponed due to the H1N1 coronavirus outbreak (other artists' performances were similarly postponed or canceled due to the declaration of a state of emergency under the revised Law Concerning Special Measures against H1N1 Influenza, etc.). Other artists' performances were similarly postponed or canceled due to the declaration of a state of emergency under the revised Law Concerning Special Measures against Influenza A (H1N1). 

It was later decided to open on July 10, which was also the first issue of the information magazine "Pia," and on the same day, Yuzu sang "Eikono Kakehashi (Bridge of Glory)" as a video streaming (pre-recorded) to open the event. The first audience-accessible performance was Ryo Nishikido's fan meeting "RYO NISHIKIDO FAN MEETING 2020" (held on August 1 and 2 of the same year).

In August 2022, the fan meeting of the Thai channel Gmmtv was held including some of its main artists such as Bright Win, Ohm Nanon, Tay New, Krist, Earth, Mix and Dew Nani.

See also 
 List of indoor arenas in Japan

References

External links

Web Site

Buildings and structures in Yokohama
Music venues completed in 2020
Indoor arenas in Japan
Music venues in Japan
2020 establishments in Japan